Helpless is a play by Dusty Hughes which premièred at the Donmar Warehouse, London on March 2, 2000. It is set in England before, during, and after the 1997 general elections, which resulted in New Labour's landslide victory and in Tony Blair becoming Prime Minister.

Outline of the plot
Will and Claire are typical children of the 1960s: They had their socialist and Marxist ideals and, a couple back then, rebelled against The Establishment and, generally, tried to fight for what they considered the right causes. They also tried to adapt their own lifestyle to their ideals. But a quarter of a century or more later, circumstances have forced them to change: Will and Claire have long split up. Will is now a minor actor doing TV commercials and sharing his flat with his grown-up daughter, Frankie. Claire is abroad most of the time doing charity work in Third World countries. Although raised to be a critical and independent young woman, Frankie has nevertheless adopted one or two characteristics of her own generation. When the play opens she is having an affair with Ben, a young man her age who works in the phone centre of some courier service.

Will meets a woman in her early thirties, Kate, who is desperate to find a man who will make her pregnant. She thinks she has found the right one in Will when they meet by chance. Will is too weak to openly tell her that, at 48, he would rather not be a father again. At the same time, at a book launch, Frankie—who goes there instead of her father—is chatted up by Hugh. Hugh is in fact her godfather and an old friend of her parents', but over the past decades they have drifted apart. At first Frankie openly tells him that he is too old for her ("I don't do dinners"), but then she genuinely (or so) falls in love with him and chucks Ben, who, as a consequence, turns pathological and starts following her around, declaring his love for her. Hugh has become a bestselling author under the nom de plume of Alice Wilde, writing popular novels where "something happens in every paragraph" (Will). This is how Hugh has got rid of his old convictions—by making money and being successful (and even being offered an OBE). He has left his wife and his three kids and now starts living with Frankie.

Gradually, the follies of their youth come to the surface. Early in May 1997, at Hugh's flat, they all come together to have an election party (with the TV turned off), clinging to what has been left of their left-wing ideals and reminiscing about the old days. (For example, Will has brought two heavy boxes containing all his vinyl records of the 1960s and 1970s, which he gives to Frankie as a present.) They smoke a joint together (including Frankie—this is how she has been brought up, too). Their meeting is also some kind of reunion:  for the first time after more than a year, Will and Claire see their daughter again.

From Hugh's point of view, their (married) life is not really so great as may be expected. Hugh misses his children enormously (they still phone him and tell him about the little things they have just been doing) but he is not at all encouraged by Frankie to go and see them. Hugh has been given a seven-figure contract for three new novels, but now, after the first one, he seems to have writer's block. Hugh and Frankie have been travelling around a lot, Hugh has sold his house in India, and under Frankie's influence, they have given a considerable amount of money to charitable causes (the wrong ones, Claire thinks). Hugh asks Will to explain his looming financial crisis to Frankie, but Will refuses ("She's your problem now.").

During that election party Claire, high on pot, talks about her fling with Hugh way back in the 1970s—an affair Will knew about and (willy-nilly) approved of but which is news to the horrified Frankie. It turns out that Claire's life has not been easy: She has been held responsible for the deaths of a group of freedom fighters in Africa who, as she claims, acted against her instructions and who were shot by enemies. As far as her private life is concerned, she admits that she has been chasing a French doctor across half the continent, but in the end he found someone else. Now she offers Will to move in with her again.

Will, however, has other plans. He has an on-and-off relationship with Kate. It takes Kate a long time (too long really) to find out that Will does not want to make her pregnant ("Did you come this morning? Did you ejaculate?"—this is what she asks him in front of the others. Only gradually does he admit that he has faked an orgasm.). In order not to have to admit that he is unwilling to be a father again, he is even prepared to pay £2,000 for artificial insemination (IVF). Will and Kate go to the clinic together, Kate is operated on and six of her eggs are removed from her womb for insemination with Will's sperm. But Will is not capable (mentally rather than physically) to ejaculate in the small room that has been provided for that purpose. (He claims to be completely exhausted, and that his mobile phone started ringing while he was trying.) So Kate walks out on him. In the final scene, however, she is nine months pregnant. Will readily admits he is not the father but he and Kate will stay together, and he will assist her in bringing up her child, although—the biological father being black ("Nigerian") -- everybody will realize that it is not his child.

Cast
Will Ron Cook
Kate Julie Graham
Frankie Rachel Stirling
Hugh Art Malik
Claire Charlotte Cornwell
Ben Craig Kelly

From the reviews
"If anyone out there wonders whatever happened to the hard-Left, young things of the Seventies, Dusty Hughes has an answer. In his appealing comedy of disillusion and disappointment, Hughes sets his sights upon three lapsed Lefties for whom the middle-aged pursuit of love, and particularly young lovers, has replaced politics. Souls have been sold. Ideals put out to grass. And Hughes puts a genial cynicism to work at his middle-aged trio's expense. But the ample mockery to which he subjects these lost-hopers is not hostile. For Hughes was fairly far to the Left in his own youth. Helpless's rueful fun is essentially lighthearted. It never stoops to serious political argument or recriminations. But, oh, how the play looks back in witty nostalgia to a lost England of plenty when we "had everything. Free orange juice. Free milk. Free education. Free love…" Hughes skims lightly and at speed over things political. His 90-minute play is far more a light comedy of sexual and social manners, made piquant by the gulf between the generations, than it is political elegy." (The London Evening Standard).

"Utterly slick and relentlessly determined to entertain, Helpless, a new play by Dusty Hughes at the Donmar Warehouse, lives solely on the surface. Its six characters all sound like mere Characters In Plays, nothing more. They have flamboyant entrance lines in which they draw attention to themselves and deliver more plot exposition than is sane; they go in for longer-than-long conversations of oneliners (like endless tennis rallies between players you don't care about); they do a great deal of speaking at cross-purposes. All of which makes all six of them deeply irritating, and all of which proves wholly contrived. Hughes's themes feel like so much tokenism. None of the characters is believable. Or interesting. Worst, in a play about different kinds of liberal socialists between the late 1990s and today, the unspontaneous soundbite artificiality of the way they talk just sounds like so much spin." (The Financial Times).

Plays by Dusty Hughes
2000 plays